Cochylis discerta is a moth of the family Tortricidae. It is found in China (Gansu, Inner Mongolia, Shanxi) and Mongolia.

References

Moths described in 1970
Cochylis
Moths of Asia
Taxa named by Józef Razowski